North Eleuthera Airport is an airport in North Eleuthera on Eleuthera in the Bahamas . It serves the outlying islands of Harbour Island and Spanish Wells as well as the northernmost third of Eleuthera Island.

Airlines and destinations

Passenger

References

Airports in the Bahamas
Eleuthera